Wild River Dam or Herberton Dam is a dam about  northeast of Herberton, Queensland on Moomin Road.

References

Reservoirs in Queensland
Buildings and structures in Far North Queensland
Dams in Queensland